Cyperus niigatensis is a species of sedge that is native to parts of Japan.

See also 
 List of Cyperus species

References 

niigatensis
Plants described in 1934
Flora of Japan